Uttarlai railway station is a railway station in Barmer district, western Rajasthan, India.

References

Railway stations in Barmer district